There are many types and formats of CCIR Selcall. For example, CCIR 493-4 is a standard format for HF Selcall for Land Mobile applications. CCIR (Consultative Committee on International Radio) functions  have largely been taken over by ITU-R. 
One common type of CCIR selcall used in VHF and UHF FM two-way radio communications, is a 5-tone selective calling system mainly found in some European countries and used by the Swedish Police and the Turkish Police.

The tone duration of a 5 tone CCIR selcall is 100 milliseconds (± 10 ms) and the tones are transmitted sequentially.

References

Radio technology
Telephony signals